Västra Götaland County North is one of the 29 multi-member constituencies of the Riksdag, the national legislature of Sweden. The constituency was established as Älvsborg County North in 1970 when the Riksdag changed from a bicameral legislature to a unicameral legislature. It was renamed Västra Götaland County North in 1998 when the counties of Älvsborg, Gothenburg and Bohus and Skaraborg were merged to create Västra Götaland. The constituency currently consists of the municipalities of Åmål, Bengtsfors, Dals-Ed, Färgelanda, Lysekil, Mellerud, Munkedal, Orust, Sotenäs, Strömstad, Tanum, Trollhättan, Uddevalla and Vänersborg. The constituency currently elects eight of the 349 members of the Riksdag using the open party-list proportional representation electoral system. At the 2022 general election it had 208,144 registered electors.

Electoral system
Västra Götaland County North currently elects eight of the 349 members of the Riksdag using the open party-list proportional representation electoral system. Constituency seats are allocated using the modified Sainte-Laguë method. Only parties that that reach the 4% national threshold and parties that receive at least 12% of the vote in the constituency compete for constituency seats. Supplementary leveling seats may also be allocated at the constituency level to parties that reach the 4% national threshold.

Election results

Summary

(Excludes leveling seats)

Detailed

2020s

2022
Results of the 2022 general election held on 11 September 2022:

The following candidates were elected:
 Constituency seats - Ann-Sofie Alm (M), 657 votes; Matheus Enholm (SD), 238 votes; Paula Holmqvist (S), 1,262 votes; Johan Hultberg (M), 1,156 votes; Magnus Jacobsson (KD), 469 votes; Louise Thunström (S), 636 votes; Markus Wiechel (SD), 0 votes; and Mats Wiking (S), 796 votes.

2010s

2018
Results of the 2018 general election held on 9 September 2018:

The following candidates were elected:
 Constituency seats - Ann-Sofie Alm (M), 782 votes; Fredrik Christensson (C), 986 votes; Matheus Enholm (SD), 188 votes; Jörgen Hellman (S), 916 votes; Paula Holmqvist (S), 953 votes; Johan Hultberg (M), 1,173 votes; Jimmy Ståhl (SD), 5 votes; and Mats Wiking (S), 1,148 votes.
 Leveling seats - Magnus Jacobsson (KD), 449 votes; and Elin Segerlind (V), 420 votes.

2014
Results of the 2014 general election held on 14 September 2014:

The following candidates were elected:
 Constituency seats - Mikael Cederbratt (M), 629 votes; Jörgen Hellman (S), 1,233 votes; Paula Holmqvist (S), 872 votes; Peter Johnsson (S), 1,433 votes; Jonas Millard SD); 0 votes; Annika Qarlsson (C), 1,124 votes; Camilla Waltersson Grönvall (M), 1,035 votes; Markus Wiechel (SD), 6 votes; and Maria Andersson Willner (S), 975 votes.
 Leveling seats - Said Abdu (FP), 491 votes; Rossana Dinamarca (V), 1,354 votes; Janine Alm Ericson (MP), 624 votes; and Penilla Gunther (KD), 475 votes.

2010
Results of the 2010 general election held on 19 September 2010:

The following candidates were elected:
 Constituency seats - Anita Brodén (FP), 855 vites; Mikael Cederbratt (M), 1,950 votes; Jörgen Hellman (S), 567 votes; Peter Johnsson (S), 2,958 votes; Christina Oskarsson (S), 924 votes; Annika Qarlsson (C), 1,012 votes; Peter Rådberg (MP), 557 votes; Henrik Ripa (M), 1,588 votes; and Camilla Waltersson Grönvall (M), 820 votes.
 Leveling seats - Erik Almqvist (SD), 20 votes; Rossana Dinamarca (V), 1,197 votes; and Penilla Gunther (KD), 553 votes.

2000s

2006
Results of the 2006 general election held on 17 September 2006:

The following candidates were elected:
 Constituency seats - Britt Bohlin Olsson (S), 2,360 votes; Anita Brodén (FP), 725 vites; Mikael Cederbratt (M), 1,970 votes; Jörgen Hellman (S), 343 votes; Peter Johnsson (S), 1,882 votes; Björn Leivik (M), 1,184 votes; Christina Nenes (S), 883 votes; Annika Qarlsson (C), 1,404 votes; and Ingemar Vänerlöv (KD), 750 votes.
 Leveling seats - Rossana Dinamarca (V), 866 votes; and Peter Rådberg (MP), 464 votes.

2002
Results of the 2002 general election held on 15 September 2002:

The following candidates were elected:
 Constituency seats - Britt Bohlin (S), 4,339 votes; Anita Brodén (FP), 1,685 vites; Peter Johnsson (S), 2,177 votes; Christina Nenes (S), 1,198 votes; Elizabeth Nyström (M), 1,948 votes; Annika Qarlsson (C), 1,348 votes; Nils-Erik Söderqvist (S), 885 votes; Rossana Valeria Dinamarca (V), 1,773 votes; and Ingemar Vänerlöv (KD), 320 votes.
 Leveling seats - Barbro Feltzing (MP), 477 votes.

1990s

1998
Results of the 1998 general election held on 20 September 1998:

The following candidates were elected:
 Constituency seats - Britt Bohlin (S), 2,525 votes; Ingvar Johnsson (S), 2,590 votes; Björn Leivik (M), 2,010 votes; Christina Nenes (S), 1,629 votes; Elizabeth Nyström (M), 2,598 votes; Fanny Rizell (KD), 292 votes; Stig Sandström (V), 579 votes; Nils-Erik Söderqvist (S), 1,244 votes; and Ingemar Vänerlöv (KD), 364 votes.
 Leveling seats - Marianne Andersson (C), 1,421 votes; Barbro Johansson (MP), 396 votes; and Elver Jonsson (FP), 828 votes.

1994
Results of the 1994 general election held on 18 September 1994:

1991
Results of the 1991 general election held on 15 September 1991:

1980s

1988
Results of the 1988 general election held on 18 September 1988:

1985
Results of the 1985 general election held on 15 September 1985:

1982
Results of the 1982 general election held on 19 September 1982:

1970s

1979
Results of the 1979 general election held on 16 September 1979:

1976
Results of the 1976 general election held on 19 September 1976:

1973
Results of the 1973 general election held on 16 September 1973:

1970
Results of the 1970 general election held on 20 September 1970:

References

Riksdag constituencies
Riksdag constituencies established in 1970
Riksdag constituency, North